This is a list of the squads with their players that competed at the 2016–17 LEN Euro Cup.

Pays D'Aix Natation

Bayer Uerdingen

Canottieri Napoli

FTC Budapest

Hornets Kosice

Jadran Carine

Kinef Kirishi

Primorac Kotor

Mladost Zagreb

Montpellier

Digi Oradea

Posillipo Napoli

OSC Potsdam

VK Primorje

Posk Split

Shturm 2002

CN Terrassa

SM Verona

Bvsc-Zuglo

References

2016–17 LEN Euro Cup
LEN Euro Cup squads